Edward Ray Reed (March 15, 1891 – February 18, 1970) was an American politician who served in both houses of the West Virginia Legislature. He was the Republican nominee for state auditor in 1956, losing a close race to incumbent Edgar B. Sims.

References

1891 births
1970 deaths
Republican Party members of the West Virginia House of Delegates
Republican Party West Virginia state senators